Kenny de Meirleir is best known for his work on chronic fatigue syndrome (CFS), including the book Chronic Fatigue Syndrome: A Biological Approach (2002) which he co-edited with Patrick Englebienne.

Education and career
De Meirleir gained his medical degree from the VUB in Brussels in 1977, and completed an internal medicine residency in the Department of Internal Medicine, University Hospital of Vrije Universiteit, Brussels.

He is among the authors of over 92 published scientific articles, most of them related to CFS.

Publications
Books:
 Kenny De Meirleir, Patrick Englebienne, Chronic Fatigue Syndrome: A Biological Approach (2002), 
 Kenny De Meirleir, Neil Mcgregor, Pediatric Chronic Fatigue Syndrome (2007), 
 Michel Osteaux, Kenny de Meirleir, Magnetic Resonance Imaging and Spectroscopy in Sports Medicine (1991), 

Articles:
 Meeusen, Romain, and Kenny De Meirleir. "Exercise and brain neurotransmission." Sports Medicine 20, no. 3 (1995): 160-188.

References

External links
 Dr. Kenny De Meirleir – Man on the Move for ME/CFS, ProHealth
 ME/CFS & Chronic Infection of the Gut – Notes on Dr. Kenny De Meirleir’s Presentation in Perth, ProHealth

Belgian physiologists
Vrije Universiteit Brussel alumni
Living people
Chronic fatigue syndrome
Year of birth missing (living people)